Alepochori may refer to the following places in Greece:

Alepochori, Achaea, a village in the municipal unit of Tritaia, Achaea
Alepochori, Arcadia, a village in the municipal unit of Skiritida, Arcadia
Alepochori, Evros, a village in the municipal unit of Metaxades, Evros
Alepochori, Ioannina, a village in the municipal unit of Lakka Souliou, Ioannina
Alepochori, Laconia, a village in the municipal unit of Geronthres, Laconia

See also
 Alpochori, Elis